Fonseca Sinfónico, also simply known as Sinfónico (English: Symphonic), is collaborative live album by Colombian singer-songwriter Fonseca in collaboration with the National Symphony Orchestra of Colombia, released first in United States on July 9, 2014, and more later on July 29, 2014 in Latin America by EMI Mexico. Is the second live album Fonseca, since Live Bogotá (2010).

The album was engineered by Eduardo Bergallo (11 Episodios Sinfonicos) and arranged and co-produced by Colombian film composer Juan Andres Otalora. At the Latin Grammy Awards of 2014, the album won the award for Best Traditional Pop Vocal Album, and was nominated Album of the Year.

Track listing

Charts

References

Fonseca (singer) albums
2014 live albums
2014 video albums
Live video albums
Latin Grammy Award for Best Traditional Pop Vocal Album
Spanish-language live albums